The 2011–12 Heineken Cup was the 17th season of the Heineken Cup, the annual rugby union European club competition for clubs from the top six nations in European rugby. The final was held at Twickenham on Saturday, 19 May 2012, kicking off at 5 pm (16:00 UTC).

Leinster lifted the Heineken Cup by defeating fellow Pro12 and Irish side Ulster 42–14. The victory gave Leinster their third Heineken Cup title in four years – a run of success unprecedented in the competition's history.

Teams
The default allocation of teams is as follows:
 England: 6 teams, based on performance in the Aviva Premiership and Anglo-Welsh Cup
 France: 6 teams, based on regular-season finish in the Top 14
 Ireland: 3 teams, based on regular-season finish in the Celtic League
 Wales: 3 teams, based on regular-season finish in the Celtic League
 Italy and Scotland: 2 teams each, based on participation in the Celtic League (although there are only 2 from each nation)

The remaining two places are filled by the winners of the previous year's Heineken Cup and Amlin Challenge Cup. If the cup winners are already qualified through their domestic league, an additional team from their country will claim a Heineken Cup place (assuming another team is available). Accordingly, Harlequins claimed the Challenge Cup winner's berth, and since Heineken Cup winners Leinster were already domestically qualified, the extra Irish berth went to Connacht.

Seeding
The seeding system was the same as in the 2010–11 tournament. The 24 competing teams are ranked based on past Heineken Cup and European Challenge Cup performance, with each pool receiving one team from each quartile, or Tier. The requirement to have only one team per country in each pool, however, still applies (with the exception of the inclusion of the seventh English team).

The brackets show each team's European Rugby Club Ranking at the end of the 2010–11 season.

Pool stage

The draw for the pool stage took place on 7 June 2011.

Under rules of the competition organiser, European Rugby Cup, tiebreakers within each pool are as follows.
 Competition points earned in head-to-head matches
 Total tries scored in head-to-head matches
 Point differential in head-to-head matches

ERC has four additional tiebreakers, used if tied teams are in different pools, or if the above steps cannot break a tie between teams in the same pool:
 Tries scored in all pool matches
 Point differential in all pool matches
 Best disciplinary record (fewest players receiving red or yellow cards in all pool matches)
 Coin toss

Pool 1

Pool 2

Pool 3

Pool 4

Pool 5

Pool 6

Seeding and runners-up
 Bare numbers indicate Heineken Cup quarterfinal seeding.
 Numbers with "C" indicate Challenge Cup quarterfinal seeding.

Knock-out stages

Quarter-finals

Semi-finals

Final

References

 
Heineken Cup seasons
Heineken
Heineken
Heineken
Heineken
Heineken
Heineken